The Troy Trojans women's volleyball team represents Troy University in the sport of volleyball. The Trojans compete in Division I of the National Collegiate Athletics Association (NCAA) and the Sun Belt Conference (SBC).  The Trojans play their home matches in Trojan Arena on the university's Troy, Alabama campus, and are currently led by head coach Josh Lauer.

History 
The Troy Trojans women's volleyball was founded in 1975 under the direction of Troy State's women's athletic director, Joyce Sorrell, who was also named the head coach of the team.  The team competed in the Alabama AIAW before moving to the NCAA's Division II in 1980.

In 1983, the team won its first conference championship, winning the Gulf South Conference Tournament title, and fishing the season with an overall record of 29–15.  The volleyball team reached their greatest milestone when they again won the Gulf South Conference Tournament title in 1990, finishing with an overall record of 33–6, which is currently the most wins in a season that Troy volleyball has ever had.

During the 2021 season, Troy set a program record for the most wins over Power 5 teams in one season.  Troy beat Alabama, LSU, and Virginia Tech that season, finishing with an 18–13 record with an appearance in the NIVC tournament.  Troy would defeat Middle Tennessee in the first round, before falling to North Florida in the second round.

Attendance
Below is a list of Troy's top single-game attendance figures.

Conference championships

Regular season
 1989 – Gulf South Conference Regular Season Champions
 1996 – Mid-Continent Conference East Division Champions
 1997 – Atlantic Sun West Division Champions

Tournament
 1983 – Gulf South Conference Tournament Champions
 1989 – Gulf South Conference Tournament Champions
 1990 – Gulf South Conference Tournament Champions

Postseason Results

NCAA tournament
The Troy women's volleyball team has never been to the NCAA tournament.

NIVC tournament

Yearly Results

References